The 1998 Boston College Eagles football team represented Boston College during the 1998 NCAA Division I-A football season. Boston College was a member of the Big East Conference during the 1998 season. The Eagles played their home games in 1998 at Alumni Stadium in Chestnut Hill, Massachusetts, which has been their home stadium since 1957.

Schedule

References

Boston College
Boston College Eagles football seasons
Boston College Eagles football
Boston College Eagles football